Shut-in Creek is a stream in Iron and Reynolds Counties in the U.S. state of Missouri. It is a tributary of Imboden Fork.

The stream flows south-southwest passing between Bell and Lindsey mountains and enters Reynolds County. The stream turns south and southeast as it continues to its confluence with the Imboden Fork about one mile north of the community of Monterey. The confluence is just east of the northwest section of Johnson's Shut-Ins State Park.

Shut-in Creek was named for the fact its course runs through a valley between high peaks.

See also
List of rivers of Missouri

References

Rivers of Iron County, Missouri
Rivers of Reynolds County, Missouri
Rivers of Missouri